Below is a list of current team squads that compete in the National Rugby League of Australia and New Zealand.

Brisbane Broncos

Canberra Raiders

Canterbury-Bankstown Bulldogs

Cronulla-Sutherland Sharks

Dolphins

Gold Coast Titans

Manly Warringah Sea Eagles

Melbourne Storm

Newcastle Knights

New Zealand Warriors

North Queensland Cowboys

Parramatta Eels

Penrith Panthers

South Sydney Rabbitohs

St. George Illawarra Dragons

Sydney Roosters

Wests Tigers

See also

List of current NRL Women's team squads
List of current NRL coaches

References

Team squads
NRL Team squads
 Team squads
National Rugby League